WR 135 is a variable Wolf-Rayet star located around 6,000 light years away from Earth in the constellation of Cygnus, surrounded by a faint bubble nebula blown by the intense radiation and fast wind from the star. It is just over four times the radius of the sun, but due to a temperature of 63,000 K it is 250,000 times as luminous as the sun.

WR 135, together with WR 134 and WR 137, was one of three stars in Cygnus observed in 1867 to have unusual spectra consisting of intense emission lines rather than the more normal continuum and absorption lines.  These were the first members of the class of stars that came to be called Wolf-Rayet stars (WR stars) after Charles Wolf and Georges Rayet who discovered their unusual appearance.  It is a member of the carbon sequence of WR stars, indicated by the lack of nitrogen lines and the strength of carbon emission.  WR 135 has a spectrum with CIII emission slightly stronger than CIV, leading to the assignment of a WC8 spectral type.  The spectrum also shows strong HeI emission and weaker lines of HeII and CII.

WR 135 is less than a degree away from WR 134 and the two are believed to lie at approximately the same distance from Earth within the Cygnus OB3 association. Both stars lie within a shell of hydrogen thought to have been swept up from the interstellar medium when one or both stars were on the main sequence. It is unclear which of the two stars is primarily responsible for creating the shell.

WR 135 has two close companions.  HD 228235 is an 11th magnitude star 53" away and there is also a 12th magnitude star 41" away.

References

External links
Wolf-Rayet shells showing a spectrum of WR 135
WR134 Ring Nebula with WR 135 visible in the top left corner

Cygnus (constellation)
Wolf–Rayet stars
Cygni, V1042
099525
192103
Durchmusterung objects